Jumping Into the Abyss is a 1933 German crime film directed by Harry Piel and starring Piel, Elga Brink and Anton Pointner.

The film's sets were designed by Artur Günther and Willi Herrmann.

Cast
 Harry Piel as Harry Peters
 Elga Brink as Betty Bergen
 Anton Pointner as Baron Moll
 Hermann Blaß as Karl Schöning
 Gerhard Bienert as Walter Volkmann
 Hilde Hildebrand as Eva Volkmann
 Hans Ritter as Prank
 Max Diekmann as Rattke
 Camilla Spira as Anni
 Justus Glatz as Toni, ein Bergführer
 Engelbert Freudling as Geiersbacher, ein Bergführer
 Hermann Vallentin as Generaldirektor Schenk
 Georg John as Fotograf

References

Bibliography

External links 
 

1933 films
1933 crime films
Films of Nazi Germany
German crime films
1930s German-language films
Films directed by Harry Piel
German black-and-white films
1930s German films